Jaswant Singh (1938–2020) was an Indian cabinet minister.

Jaswant Singh may also refer to:
 Jaswant Singh of Marwar (1629–1678), ruler
 Jaswant Singh II (1838–1895), Maharaja of Jodhpur
 Jaswant Singh of Bharatpur (1851–1893), ruler
 Jaswant Singh (field hockey) (1931–2022), field hockey player
 Jaswant Singh (Khoji) (pre-1960–1999), Punjabi writer

People with the given names
 Jaswant Singh Bishnoi, Member of Indian Parliament
 Jaswant Singh Kanwal, Punjabi writer
 Jaswant Singh Khalra, human rights activist
 Jaswant Singh Marwah, journalist and author
 Jaswant Singh Neki, Sikh scholar
 Jaswant Singh Rahi, Punjabi poet and independence activist
 Jaswant Singh Rajput, field hockey player
 Jaswant Singh Rathor, ruler of Marwar
 Jaswant Singh Rawat, soldier